Akbar Ka Bal... Birbal (transl... Akbar's Power Birbal) is an Indian Hindi historical comedy show that aired on Star Bharat and digitally available on Disney+ Hotstar. The show starred Ali Asgar and Vishal Kotian as Akbar and Birbal respectively. This show is based on folktales of mighty Mughal Emperor Akbar and his witty and trusted courtier Birbal. This show revolves around Akbar and Birbal's friendship. This show is produced by Nikhil Sinha under the banner of Triangle Film Company.

Cast 
 Ali Asgar as Akbar
 Vishal Kotian as Birbal / Insaaf
 Aditi Sajwan as Jodha Bai
 Charu Asopa Sen as Tarabai
 Pawan Singh as Salim
 Vijay Badlani as Digvijay Singh
  Rose Sardana as Tilotamma
 Sumit Arora as Rafique
 Malkhan Singh Gaur as Karmaveer
 Nikita Sharma as Ichhadhari Naagin
 Sooraj Thapar as Kaamran (Bairam Khan)
 Manoj Pandey as Sultan Nigah Baksh
 Tanu Vidyarthi as Sultana Begum
 Rajeev Bhardwaj as Fazal Khan
 Dheeraj Miglani as Saala Khan
 Pearl V Puri as Fahad Khan

Production

Filming 
The series was filmed at the historical sets created in Mumbai.

Cancellation and resuming

The show was abruptly axed midway by the channel on 23 October 2020 due to its low trp. But on 18 November 2020 it started telecasting its remaining few bank episodes on the morning slot.

Reception
The Times of India stated, "A lot of twists with a heavy pinch of entertainment that is what Akbar Ka Bal…Birbal has been. With every new episode, the makers have made sure to keep the audience engaged with their powerful content."

References

See also 
 Har Mushkil Ka Hal Akbar Birbal
 List of programs broadcast by Star Bharat

Indian comedy television series
2020 Indian television series debuts
2020 Indian television series endings
Mughal Empire in fiction
Cultural depictions of Akbar
Cultural depictions of Jahangir